Beyond the Wall is the twelfth studio album by Kenny Garrett released in August 2006 from Nonesuch Records.
It received a Grammy Award nomination in Best Jazz Instrumental Album. Among the musicians are legendary tenor saxophonist Pharoah Sanders, vibraphonist Bobby Hutcherson, pianist Mulgrew Miller and drummer Brian Blade.

For Garrett, Beyond the Wall is a continuation of his fascination with and study of Asian cultures and philosophies. On Beyond the Wall Garrett mixed Chinese instrumentation with Western strings, creating an amalgam of musical styles, which hang together effortlessly. Some of the tracks on Beyond the Wall relate specifically to his travels.

Track listing

Personnel 
Musicians
Kenny Garrett – alto saxophone (tracks 1–4, 6–9), piano (track 5)
Mulgrew Miller - piano (tracks 1–4, 6–9)
Pharoah Sanders – tenor saxophone (tracks 1–4, 6–8)
Bobby Hutcherson – vibraphone (tracks 3, 4, 6–8)
Robert Hurst III – bass
Brian Blade – drums
Rogerio Boccato – percussion (tracks 1, 3–8)
Jonathan Gandelsman – violin (track 5)
Neil Humphrey – cello (track 5)
Guowei Wang – erhu (track 5)
Susan Jolles – harp (track 5)
Nedelka Echols – vocals (tracks 3, 4, 6, 8)
Arlene Lewis – vocals (tracks 6, 8)
Dawn Caveness – vocals (tracks 6, 8) 
Genea Martin – vocals (tracks 6, 8) 
Geovanti Steward – vocals (tracks 6, 8)
Kevin Wheatley – vocals (tracks 6, 8)

Production
Kenny Garrett – producer
Steven Epstein – producer, engineer (mastering)
Todd Whitelock – engineer (mastering, mixing)
David Stoller – engineer (assistant)
Jason Stasium – engineer (assistant)
Timmy Olmstead – engineer (assistant)
Doyle Partners – design
Mark Anderson – photography
Barron Claiborne – photography (of Kenny Garrett)

Awards and nominations

Chart positions

References

External links 
Beyond the Wall by Kenny Garrett (Nonesuch Records)

Nonesuch Records albums
Kenny Garrett albums
2006 albums